Patsy Biscoe  (born 21 March 1946) is an Australian children's television personality, singer and guitarist. She regularly appeared on children's national television shows, Here's Humphrey and Fat Cat and Friends. She has released many children's music albums containing nursery rhymes and similar children's songs and has sold in excess of 500,000 units in her musical career.

Early life and training
Biscoe was born in Shimla, India, to a British army officer and a civil servant. She came to Australia and settled in Sydney with her family during the Partition of India, and they moved to Sandy Bay in Hobart when she was nine. She won a classical singing scholarship after making an unscheduled appearance at the St Mary's College annual eisteddfod. While studying medicine at the University of Tasmania, she sang and played the guitar at a Sunday night jazz club. Her studies and fledgling career were interrupted by a car accident which damaged her eyesight. She covered a scar on her forehead from the accident with what became her distinctive long-fringed haircut.

Biscoe was a finalist in the Starflight International talent quest of the Australian television show, Bandstand, competing for an overseas trip and a recording contract. She recorded her first LP in Sydney in 1965 with CBS records.

Career
She gained fame in her adopted home of Adelaide when she regularly appeared on the Nine Network children's show, Here's Humphrey (1965–2008), which she hosted from September 1970. Later she was a presenter on local TV children's show, Channel Niners. She also appeared as a singer on another children's TV show, Fat Cat and Friends (1972–91), on SAS-10. In October 1980 she promoted wearing seat belts for children in a TV ad campaign by the Road Safety Council in South Australia.

After retiring from performing, Biscoe became a naturopath. She has also been Deputy Mayor of the Barossa Council local government area and Chair of the Tanunda Town Committee.

Recognition
Biscoe was made a Member of the Order of Australia in 2016 for her services to music and her local community.

During the early 1990s, Biscoe was parodied by Adelaide comedian Glynn Nicholas who played Paté Biscuit on the Australian Broadcasting Corporation television comedy show, The Big Gig. Biscoe appeared in several episodes with Nicholas, one time tying up Biscuit and taking his place on the show with Bongo, Biscuit's hand puppet. She also appeared on the show using her own hand puppet, Bongette—the female counterpart of Bongo. When on screen together, neither Bongo nor Bongette could hide their attraction for the other.

Discography

Studio albums

Notes

References

External links

1946 births
Living people
Australian women singers
Australian children's musicians
Australian television personalities
Women television personalities
People from Shimla
People from New South Wales
Musicians from Adelaide
Australian women guitarists
Members of the Order of Australia
University of Tasmania alumni
Indian emigrants to Australia
Australian people of British descent
Deputy mayors of places in Australia
South Australian local councillors